Jacob van der Schuere (1676 – after 1643), was a Dutch Golden Age writer.

Biography
He was born in Menen but moved north to Haarlem where he became a schoolmaster and wrote educational books. In 1612, he published the work Nederduytsche spellinge, which was a proposal for a comprehensive spelling of the Dutch language and in 1643 he published the math book Arithmetica oft reken-konst.

He probably died in Haarlem some time after the publication of his second book, though his death is not recorded.

References

Jacob van der Schuere in the DBNL

1676 births
1640s deaths
Dutch Golden Age writers
People from Menen
Writers from Haarlem